Stephen Christopher Trachsel (born October 31, 1970) is an American former Major League Baseball pitcher with the Chicago Cubs, Tampa Bay Devil Rays, Toronto Blue Jays, New York Mets and the Baltimore Orioles between 1993 and 2008. He batted and threw right-handed.

Amateur career
Trachsel graduated from Troy High School in Fullerton, California, in 1988. He attended Fullerton College and Long Beach State University. In , he led Long Beach to a spot in the College World Series. He was drafted by the Chicago Cubs in the eighth round (215th overall) 1991 MLB draft.

Professional career

Minor League Baseball
In , Trachsel began his professional career with the short-season Geneva Cubs and the Class-A Advanced Winston-Salem Spirits. He went a combined 5–4 with a 3.27 ERA in 14 starts.

He was 13–8 with a 3.06 ERA and 135 strikeouts in 29 starts.

Chicago Cubs
He began the  season with the Triple-A Iowa Cubs where he went 13–8 with a 3.95 ERA and 135 strikeouts in 27 games (26 starts). Trachsel was promoted to the Major Leagues in September and made his debut on September 19 against the Florida Marlins, going seven innings with five strikeouts while giving up two earned runs and taking the loss.

Trachsel would play most of the  season with Chicago, pitching just two games in Iowa and going 0–2 with a 10.00 ERA. His major league stats were much better, as he finished 9–7 with a 3.21 ERA in 22 starts. He also had one complete game and struck out 108 total over the season.

In , Trachsel spent his first full season at the Major League level. He went 7–13 with a 5.15 ERA, 117 strikeouts and two complete games in 30 games (29 starts).

He also finished the season with a record of 13–9 with two shutouts, three complete games and 132 strikeouts in 32 starts. His first shutout was a one-hit game against the Houston Astros on May 14 where he surrendered the only hit on a lead-off double to Brian Hunter. He also made two starts with the Double-A Orlando Cubs, where he went 0–1 with a 2.77 ERA.

In , Trachsel started a career-high 34 games with the Cubs, a record he has tied twice. He went 8–12 with a 4.51 ERA and 160 strikeouts. He led the National League in home runs allowed and was second in hits allowed.

In , Trachsel went 15–8 with an ERA of 4.46, 149 strikeouts and one complete game in 33 starts. On September 8, Trachsel allowed Mark McGwire's record breaking 62nd home run, breaking Roger Maris' longtime record of 61. McGwire hit the pitch 341 feet over the left field wall, his shortest of the year. McGwire went on to hit 70 home runs that year.

Additionally, Trachsel was the starting and winning pitcher in the Cubs' 5–3 Wild Card tie-breaker game victory over the San Francisco Giants, giving up just one hit through six-plus innings.

In , Trachsel's ERA rose to a career-worst 5.56; his 18 losses were two worse than any pitcher that season. He became a free agent after the season.

Tampa Bay Devil Rays
On January 14, 2000, Trachsel signed a one-year, $1 million contract with the Tampa Bay Devil Rays. He began the season going 6–10 with a 4.58 ERA in 23 starts.

Toronto Blue Jays 
On July 31, 2000, Trachsel was traded to the Toronto Blue Jays along with pitcher Mark Guthrie in exchange for minor league second baseman Brent Abernathy and a player to be named later. In 11 starts with Toronto, Trachsel was 2–5 with a 5.29 ERA. Combined between Tampa Bay and Toronto, he finished 8–15 with a 4.80 ERA in 34 starts.

New York Mets
On December 12, 2000, Trachsel agreed to a two-year, $7 million contract with the New York Mets. At the time, he had a 1–6 record and a 8.24 ERA. Upon returning to the Mets, his career was reborn. He finished 2001 with an 11–13 record and a 4.46 ERA in 28 starts.

After entering free agency again following the 2002 season, Trachsel re-signed with the Mets on a two-year, $8 million contract on December 7, 2002. On August 7, 2003, Trachsel earned the 100th win of his career against the Houston Astros. Trachsel was even named the National League Player of the Week on August 25, 2003, following a 16.1 inning span in which he allowed no walks, no runs and only six hits. He underwent a discectomy in March 2005, and returned for the final six starts of the season, posting a league-average 4.14 ERA and going 1–4.

In , Trachsel recovered to start 30 games and tied Tom Glavine for the team lead with 15 wins, despite posting an ERA of 4.97. On September 18, 2006, he had one of his best performances of the season as the Mets clinched the National League Eastern Division Championship. He pitched  innings, allowing three hits and three strikeouts in the 4–0 win over the Florida Marlins. He also started the clincher of the NLDS, but was shaky and removed in the fourth inning. In Game 3 of the NLCS, he gave up five runs in just one inning before being hit by a hard ground ball. The Mets lost the game 5–0.

Baltimore Orioles and Chicago Cubs
Trachsel was signed by the Baltimore Orioles as a free agent on February 12, 2007, after Orioles starter and fellow former Mets right-hander Kris Benson was diagnosed with a torn rotator cuff that kept him sidelined for the 2007 season. On August 31, 2007, Trachsel rejoined the Chicago Cubs by being traded for minor league players Rocky Cherry and Scott Moore. On February 11, 2008, he signed a minor league contract with an invitation to spring training with the Baltimore Orioles. On March 27, he was added to the 40-man roster. He was designated for assignment on June 10, 2008. He was released on June 13, 2008.

References

External links

1970 births
Living people
American expatriate baseball players in Canada
Baltimore Orioles players
Baseball players from California
Binghamton Mets players
California State University, Long Beach alumni
Charlotte Knights players
Chicago Cubs players
Frederick Keys players
Geneva Cubs players
Iowa Cubs players
Long Beach State Dirtbags baseball players
Major League Baseball pitchers
National League All-Stars
New York Mets players
Norfolk Tides players
Orlando Cubs players
Sportspeople from Oxnard, California
Sportspeople from Ventura County, California
St. Lucie Mets players
Tampa Bay Devil Rays players
Toronto Blue Jays players
Winston-Salem Spirits players
Mat-Su Miners players